Qoli Kandi (also Romanized as Qolī Kandī; also known as Gulkandi) is a village in Mojezat Rural District, in the Central District of Zanjan County, Zanjan Province, Iran. At the 2006 census, its population was 210, in 54 families.

References 

Populated places in Zanjan County